Stronach Township is a civil township of Manistee County in the U.S. state of Michigan. The population was 821 at the 2010 census.

Communities 
 Stronach is an unincorporated community and census designated place on the western boundary of the township along the southeast end of Lake Manistee at  The settlement was first called "Paggeotville" and was renamed when John and Adam Stronach built a sawmill in 1841. A post office opened August 9, 1866 and was discontinued on December 21, 1893. Other sources indicate the post office operated until March 31, 1954 or until December 21, 1983. The area is now served by the Manistee post office with ZIP code 49660.
 Free Soil is a village to the south in Mason County and the Free Soil ZIP code 49411 also serves an area in the southern part of Stronach Township.

History
Stronach Township is the oldest non-native settlement in Manistee County.  In 1840 Joseph Stronach cleared a site to establish a sawmill in the township.  In 1841 Joseph Stronach's brother, David Stronach and his son Adam Stronach arrived by schooner with machinery and approximately 15 men to begin construction of the sawmill.

Geography

Demographics
As of the census of 2000, there were 804 people, 347 households, and 235 families residing in the township.  The population density was 14.5 per square mile (5.6/km).  There were 549 housing units at an average density of 9.9 per square mile (3.8/km).  The racial makeup of the township was 95.40% White, 2.74% Native American, 0.12% Asian, 0.37% from other races, and 1.37% from two or more races. Hispanic or Latino of any race were 0.75% of the population.

There were 347 households, out of which 27.7% had children under the age of 18 living with them, 56.5% were married couples living together, 7.8% had a female householder with no husband present, and 32.0% were non-families. 28.2% of all households were made up of individuals, and 11.8% had someone living alone who was 65 years of age or older.  The average household size was 2.32 and the average family size was 2.82.

In the township the population was spread out, with 22.0% under the age of 18, 4.6% from 18 to 24, 28.4% from 25 to 44, 29.1% from 45 to 64, and 15.9% who were 65 years of age or older.  The median age was 42 years. For every 100 females, there were 117.9 males.  For every 100 females age 18 and over, there were 110.4 males.

The median income for a household in the township was $36,181, and the median income for a family was $40,625. Males had a median income of $36,563 versus $21,369 for females. The per capita income for the township was $17,683.  About 3.8% of families and 5.4% of the population were below the poverty line, including 7.8% of those under age 18 and 4.7% of those age 65 or over.

Wildlife 
Stronach is located within the Huron-Manistee National Forests and has thousands of acres of unspoiled habitat for wildlife.  In addition to world class fly fishing, the following may be found within the township: white-tailed deer, mink, black bear, bald eagle, coyote, and the invasive species savannah monitor.

References

Townships in Manistee County, Michigan
Populated places established in 1840
Townships in Michigan
1840 establishments in Michigan